The A. J. Harwi House is a historic two-story house in Atchison, Kansas. It was built in 1886 for Alfred Jonathan Harwi, the founder of the A. J. Harwi Hardware and vice president of Atchison's Exchange National Bank. His son Frank purchased the Francis and Harriet Baker House, also listed on the NRHP.

The house was designed in the Victorian architectural style. It has been listed on the National Register of Historic Places since May 6, 1975.

References

Houses on the National Register of Historic Places in Kansas
National Register of Historic Places in Atchison County, Kansas
Victorian architecture in Kansas
Houses completed in 1886